Heibao Auto (黑豹汽车; officially Shandong HIPO Group Co., Ltd.) is a Chinese automotive manufacturing company headquartered in Weihai.

Zhonghang Heibao Co., Ltd., a subsidiary of Heibao, is listed on the Shanghai Stock Exchange.

Operations 
 Location: Weihai City, China
 Production capacity: 100,000 vehicles/year
 Employees: ~3000

Products 
 EV 2002
 EV 2003 (LSV) (sold in the US as the ZAP Worldcar)

See also
List of automobile manufacturers of China

References

External links 
Corporate Web Site (Chinese)

Car manufacturers of China
Battery electric vehicle manufacturers
Companies based in Shandong
Companies with year of establishment missing
Companies listed on the Shanghai Stock Exchange
Chinese brands
Weihai
Electric vehicle manufacturers of China